Kwame Nkrumah University (KNU) is a public university in Zambia.

Location
The geographical coordinates of Kwame Nkrumah University are:14°26'41.0"S, 28°28'02.0"E (Latitude:-14.444722; Longitude:28.467222).

History
The institution was opened in 1967, as Kabwe Teachers Training College. It trained junior secondary school teachers at its inception. Four years later, the president of Zambia at the time, Kenneth Kaunda, re-named the college Nkrumah Teachers College, in honor of Kwame Nkrumah, the first Prime Minister and first President of Ghana. During the period when Levy Mwanawasa was president (2002 to 2008), the college began transforming into a university, a process that concluded while Michael Sata was in office (2011 to 2014).

Kwame Nkrumah University was established by Part IV, Section 14 of the Higher Education Act No. 4 of 2013. At its inception, the university could only accommodate 600 students, a number that has since increased to 6,000. As of August 2016, it employed 74 full-time academic staff. At that time, the university was undergoing a major infrastructure expansion, including four student hostels; each capable of accommodating 600 students. Hua Jiang Investment Limited, a Chinese construction firm, is carrying out the construction works, on which the government of Zambia had spent in excess of ZMW:57,518,410 (approx. US$5.68 million).

The university held its first graduation ceremony under its own university letterheads in August 2015.

Locations
Nkrumah University has three campus locations. The main campus — Munkoyo Street Campus — is about 3 km from the Kabwe city center. Nkrumah University has recently acquired the PAID-ESA campus along the same street (Previously the Pan African Institute for Development - East/Southern Africa); this campus will help expand the capacity of the university. The newest campus is the West Campus. It lies immediately to the left of Main Campus. Kwame Nkrumah University has a new state of the art Library which is located at the west Library. The new campus also houses the new lecture theatre. Other infrastructure are still under construction within the same vicinity.

Academics
The following undergraduate degree courses are offered by Kwame Nkrumah University:

 Bachelor of Arts with Education in the Humanities and Social Sciences
 Bachelor of Science with Education in the Natural Sciences
 Bachelor of Business Studies with Education

Departments
The Nkrumah University is divided into 4 schools:
School of Natural Sciences with departments for:
 Life Sciences
 Physical Sciences
 Mathematics and Statistics
 Physical Education

School of Business Studies with departments for:
 Computing and Communication Technologies
 Accounting, Economics and Finance
 Marketing and Management Studies

School of Education with departments for:
 Psychology And Sociology
 Educational Administration and Policy Studies
 Languages and Social Sciences Education
 Mathematics and Science Education
 Special Education

School of Social Sciences with departments for: 
 Social Sciences
 Languages 
 Religious Studies
 Linguistics

Governance
The University Senate runs the university under the supervision of the University Council. There are four schools namely; the school of Natural Science, the school of Business Studies, the school of Humanities and Social Sciences, and the school of Education. There are two institutes; Institute of Open and Distance Learning, and the Centre for Information and Communication Technology.

Care Taker Committee of Kwame Nkrumah University composed of Dr. Yusuf Ahmed (Chairperson), Mrs. Sherry Anne Thole (Vice Chairperson), Dr. Christopher Mazimba, Dr. Elizabeth Nkumbula, Mr. Felix A. Nkandu, Dr. Phoebe Albina Bwembya, Hon. Susan B. Kawandami, Permanent Secretary Ministry of Higher Education, Permanent Secretary Ministry of Finance (Budget). Prof Hellicy Ng'ambi Vice Chancellor and Dr. Judith C.N.Lungu (Deputy Vice Chancellor) of Kwame Nkrumah University

Other facilities
 The University Guest House and Lodge.

Student life

Activities
Sports
Community service

Press and radio
Nkruman Times
Nkrumah University media

Students residences
Mulungushi hostel (gents) 
Luapula hostel (gents)
Kafue hostel (gents)
PAID-ESA hostels (gents)
Liseli hostel (females)
Chimwemwe hostel (females)
Zambezi hostel (females)
Luangwa hostel (females)
Peririntwaya hostel (females)

Sports clubs
 Netball, Football, Volleyball, Basketball

Affiliations
Nkrumah is a new member of the Association of African Universities, the Association of Commonwealth Universities, Football Association of Zambia and the International Association of Universities.

See also
Education in Zambia
List of universities in Zambia

References

External links
Website of Kwame Nkrumah University

Central Province, Zambia
1967 establishments in Zambia
Educational institutions established in 1967
Universities in Zambia